Ponta João Ribeiro is a cape in the northern part of the island of São Vicente, Cape Verde. It is 2.5 km northwest of the city centre of Mindelo. The cape divides the Canal de São Vicente and the Porto Grande Bay. The islet of Ilhéu dos Pássaros is approximately 1.3 km to the west. Near the cape is an abandoned military camp.

See also
Geography of Cape Verde

References

Headlands of Cape Verde
Geography of São Vicente, Cape Verde
Mindelo